Rotterdam is a town in Schenectady County, New York, United States. The population was 30,523 at the 2020 census.

The town of Rotterdam is in the south-central part of the county. It was founded in 1661 by Dutch settlers, who named it after the city of Rotterdam in the Netherlands, where many immigrants last touched European grounds. The town borders the city of Schenectady.

History

Situated near the eastern end of New York State's Heritage Corridor at what is known as the "Gateway to the West", the town of Rotterdam is closely linked with the early development of Schenectady. At that time the present town of Rotterdam served as the outlying farmlands and wood lots for the settlers. With few exceptions, these settlers made their homes in the stockade in Schenectady but went to their farmlands during the daytime.

The lands now known as Rotterdam became Schenectady's third ward when that city was incorporated in 1798. Rotterdam retained that status when the county of Schenectady was chartered in 1809. During this period, a council of aldermen and assistants from each of the four wards governed the city of Schenectady.  In May 1819, the city council recommended that the third and fourth wards be separated out as towns, and on December 31, a petition to the state legislature was drafted. The legislation was passed on April 14, 1820, the final day of the legislative session, creating the town of Rotterdam.

Founded as a 'first class town' in 1942, Rotterdam has since adopted the Old World Rotterdam coat of arms along with the motto Sterker door Strijd (Stronger through Struggle). By diligently applying this motto, Rotterdam faces the future with confidence.

The Dellemont-Wemple Farm was added to the National Register of Historic Places in 1973, and the Enlarged Double Lock No. 23, Old Erie Canal in 2008.

The Mabee House, at the Mabee Farm Historic Site, the oldest surviving house in the Mohawk Valley, was added to the National Register of Historic Places May 22, 1978. It is a property of the Schenectady County Historical Society, being donated by a last descendant in his particular line, Mr. George Eugene Franchere, on January 29, 1993, the 287th anniversary of the original deed. It is currently being operated as a living history museum, conducts school programs, and events for the public.

Rotterdam has historically been a good town for baseball. For many years they brought up teams that would do well in the little league tournaments and Babe Ruth tournaments. They would even have one team go on to win a national championship in the latter.

In August 1977, the all star team Carman little league (one of the little league organizations within the town, now referred to as RC little league) would go on to qualify for the little league World Series in Williamsport, Pennsylvania. They would go on to finish 4th.

3 years later in 1980, the same boys from that Carman team, along with a few mixed in from Rotterdam little league (the other little league organization in the town at the time) would become Babe Ruth World Series champions. They clawed their way out of the losers bracket to defeat Hawaii in 2 games in one day for the title. The tournament took place in Williston, North Dakota.

Years later in 2014, a team from the Rotterdam Babe Ruth League went on to go to the semifinals in the Mid-Atlantic Regional Baseball Tournament. Rotterdam is also the home of a large Net Zero housing complex.

Geography
The Mohawk River defines the northeast town line. The New York State Thruway passes through the town.

Government
The Rotterdam Town Board consists of five members, including the Supervisor who is a voting member.

Town Supervisor: Mollie Collins (R)
Councilmember: Charles "Jack" Dodson (R) [also serves as Deputy Supervisor]
Councilmember: Joseph Mastroianni (R)
Councilmember: Samantha Miller-Herrera (D) 
Councilmember: Evan Christou (C)

Demographics

As of the census of 2000, there were 28,316 people, 11,544 households, and 8,092 families residing in the town.  The population density was 787.0 people per square mile (303.9/km2).  There were 11,990 housing units at an average density of 333.3 per square mile (128.7/km2).  The racial makeup of the town was 97.26% White, 0.95% Black or African American, 0.16% Native American, 0.57% Asian, 0.01% Pacific Islander, 0.21% from other races, and 0.83% from two or more races. Hispanic or Latino of any race were 0.97% of the population.

There were 11,544 households, out of which 29.4% had children under the age of 18 living with them, 55.7% were married couples living together, 10.6% had a female householder with no husband present, and 29.9% were non-families. 25.8% of all households were made up of individuals, and 12.6% had someone living alone who was 65 years of age or older.  The average household size was 2.44 and the average family size was 2.94.

In the town, the population was spread out, with 23.1% under the age of 18, 5.8% from 18 to 24, 27.9% from 25 to 44, 24.1% from 45 to 64, and 19.1% who were 65 years of age or older.  The median age was 41 years. For every 100 females, there were 92.9 males.  For every 100 females age 18 and over, there were 88.5 males.

The median income for a household in the town was $46,267, and the median income for a family was $54,542. Males had a median income of $37,536 versus $27,527 for females. The per capita income for the town was $21,457.  About 2.8% of families and 4.5% of the population were below the poverty line, including 5.2% of those under age 18 and 5.9% of those age 65 or over.

Communities and locations in Rotterdam 
Antonia Hills – A small development off of Route 7; built by the Valentine Family.
Colonial Manor – A well-sized community between Cold Brook and South Schenectady, with housing developed in the 1950s by Charles Juracka.
Carman –  A relatively small community anchored by Carman Park.
Cold Brook – A well-sized suburban community placed on the former Campbell Family estate.
Colonial Manor – A fairly large, middle-class suburban development covering an area of about .54 square miles. The development's school districts are mixed, with some streets attending Schalmont High School and others attending Mohonasen High School. 
Eldorado Acres
Galluci Gardens; A cul-de-sac with a handful of single-family detached homes, and 3-4 Tudor homes and a few colonial homes.
Lower Rotterdam Junction – A hamlet south of Rotterdam Junction on Route 5S.
Pattersonville – A hamlet in the northern part of the town on the town line.
Rotterdam – A large suburban community west of Schenectady.
Rotterdam Junction – A hamlet near the Mohawk River on Route 5S.
Schonowe
Serafini Gardens – A medium-sized development on the border of Guilderland and Rotterdam. Contains 50-75 homes.
South Schenectady
Skyline – Development sitting on a hill overlooking Rotterdam, with about 15-20 homes.
Sunrise Estates/Caroline Manor

See also 
Rotterdam (CDP), New York
Pattersonville-Rotterdam Junction, New York

References

External links
 Town of Rotterdam official website
 Mohonasen Central School District
 Schalmont Central School
 Schenectady County Historical Society

Towns in Schenectady County, New York
1661 establishments in the Dutch Empire
Populated places on the Mohawk River